The 1993 Lehigh Engineers football team was an American football team that represented Lehigh University during the 1993 NCAA Division I-AA football season. Lehigh won the Patriot League championship.

In their eighth and final year under head coach Hank Small, the Engineers compiled a 7–4 record. Lance Haynes and Dave Cecchini were the team captains.

Despite their winning record and league championship, the Engineers were outscored by opponents 336 to 309. Lehigh's 4–1 conference record nonetheless topped the six-team Patriot League standings.

The championship was Lehigh's first in the eight-year history of the Patriot and Colonial leagues. Patriot League rules at the time prohibited members from participating in the postseason tournament. Lehigh was not ranked in the national poll; three of its four losses were to ranked opponents.

Lehigh played its home games at Goodman Stadium on the university's Goodman Campus in Bethlehem, Pennsylvania.

Schedule

References

Lehigh
Lehigh Mountain Hawks football seasons
Patriot League football champion seasons
Lehigh Engineers football